Britteney Black Rose Kapri is a Chicago-based author, educator, activist and poet, performer, and playwright.

Life 
Kapri graduated from Grand Valley State University.

She has been published in Poetry, Button Poetry, and Seven Scribes and anthologized in The BreakBeat Poets and The BreakBeat Poets Vol. 2: Black Girl Magic. Kapri has written two chapbooks:Winona and Winthrop (New School Poetics, 2014) and Black Queer Hoe (Haymarker Books, 2018 ). She was a winner of the 2015 Rona Jaffe Foundation Writer's Award.

Black Queer Hoe 
Black Queer Hoe discusses black women's sexuality and sexual liberation. Kapri included Tweets in this collection. Black Queer Hoe is about Kapri's personal experiences.

Personal life 
Kapri has a tattoo that reads, "Pro Black, Pro Queer, Pro Hoe."

References 

American women artists
21st-century American women writers
Chapbook writers
21st-century American poets
American women poets
Living people
Year of birth missing (living people)